The Co-operative branding may refer to:

Brands
The Co-operative brand - the umbrella brand used by constituents of the British co-operative movement, notably:

 The Co-operative Food - the greatest number of outlets
 The Co-operative Bank
 The Co-operative Credit Union
 The Co-operative Energy
 The Co-operative Funeralcare
 The Co-operative Insurance
 The Co-operative Legal Services
 The Co-operative Mobile
 The Co-operative Party

Organisations
The users of The Co-operative brand, notably:

 The Co-operative Group - the UK's largest
 The Co-operative Banking Group
 The Co-operative Party
 The Central England Co-operative
 The Channel Islands Co-operative Society
 The Chelmsford Star Co-operative Society
 The Midcounties Co-operative
 The Phone Co-op
 The Southern Co-operative

Movements
The British co-operative movement

See also

 The Cooperative, group of French academics
 
 
 Cooperative (disambiguation)
 Operative (disambiguation)
 Coop (disambiguation)